Limfjordsskolen is a boarding school for 16 to 19 years old men and women with learning disabilities and other difficulties. It is situated in the town of Løgstør, Denmark.

The school was founded in 1969 by the Danish state.
42 pupils stay at the school for a normally three year special education in specific subjects (arts, nature, health, waterlife, theatre) combined with a general curriculum (environment, culture, society et al.).
Beside the boarding school Limfjordsskolen offers adult persons with learning disabilities courses in art and drama in a separate department, Kunst og Teaterværksstedet (The Art- and Theatre workshop) formerly called Daghøjskolen ved Limfjordsskolen. Daghøjskolen has made several performances abroad (UK, Germany, Belgium, Spain, Lithuania, Latvia, Japan, United States, France, Norway) with a very original kind of masked mimes.

The school’s budget – app. 3 mio. EUR (2009) - is entirely publicly funded.

External links
Limfjordsskolens website
KTVs website

Special education schools in Denmark
Educational institutions established in 1969
Drama schools in Denmark
1969 establishments in Denmark
Buildings and structures in Vesthimmerland Municipality